The 2012 Web.com Tour was the 23rd Web.com Tour season. It ran from February 16 to October 28. The season consisted of 27 official money golf tournaments; four of which are played outside of the United States. The top 25 players on the year-end money list earned their PGA Tour card for 2013. The season started under sponsorship by Nationwide Mutual Insurance Company and was renamed the Web.com Tour on June 27.

Schedule
The following table lists official events during the 2012 season.

Location of tournaments

Money leaders
For full rankings, see 2012 Web.com Tour graduates.

The money list was based on prize money won during the season, calculated in U.S. dollars. The top 25 players on the tour earned status to play on the 2013 PGA Tour.

Awards

Notes

References

External links
Web.com Tour official site

Korn Ferry Tour seasons
Web.com Tour